Zhelvachevo is a rural locality (a village) in Andomskoye Rural Settlement, Vytegorsky District, Vologda Oblast, Russia. The population was 5 as of 2002.

Geography 
Zhelvachevo is located 37 km northeast of Vytegra (the district's administrative centre) by road. Makachevo is the nearest rural locality.

References 

Rural localities in Vytegorsky District